Ljubomir "Ljuba" Tadić (14 May 1925 – 31 December 2013) was a Serbian academic and politician.

He was born in Smriječno village near Plužine, then in the Kingdom Serbs, Croats and Slovenes. He was a Belgrade Law School graduate and a professor of philosophy at the University of Belgrade Faculty of Philosophy as well as a member of the Serbian Academy of Sciences and Arts. His father Pavle Tadić was a lieutenant of the Montenegrin Army in the wars against the Ottoman Empire. Pavle opened the first school in Piva, during the Kingdom of Yugoslavia. 

Tadić was one of the founders of the Democratic Party (DS) in Serbia in December 1989. He was one of the leaders of the pro-European movement in Serbia. Tadić was of the Piva Herzegovinian clan.

Tadić was married to psychiatrist Nevenka Kićanović and had two children. His son Boris Tadić served as the President of Serbia from 2004 to 2012.  Ljuba Tadić died in Belgrade, Serbia, aged 88.

External links
Tadić's article remembering Zoran Đinđić
Serbian Academy of Sciences and Arts membership page in Social Sciences
Dnevni list Danas, Beton, Bulevar zvezda - TADIĆ, LJUBOMIR

1925 births
2013 deaths
People from Plužine
Serbs of Montenegro
Yugoslav Partisans members
Democratic Party (Serbia) politicians
Academic staff of the University of Belgrade
Philosophy academics
Members of the Serbian Academy of Sciences and Arts
Serbian writers
University of Belgrade Faculty of Law alumni
University of Belgrade Faculty of Philosophy alumni
Boris Tadić
Burials at Belgrade New Cemetery